Mirna Vas is a small village in the Municipality of Mokronog-Trebelno in southeastern Slovenia. The area is part of the historical region of Lower Carniola and is now included in the Southeast Slovenia Statistical Region. The village includes the hamlets of Mirna Dolina, Lipovec, and Vinjvršč.

References

External links
Mirna Vas on Geopedia

Populated places in the Municipality of Mokronog-Trebelno